Daphne malyana is a shrub, of the family Thymelaeaceae.  It is native to Montenegro, Serbia, and Bosnia.

Description
The shrub is deciduous to semi-evergreen, and grows up to 15 cm tall. It is scented, bears orange fruit, and flowers white. It is often found in crevices of limestone rocks.

See also
List of Balkan endemic plants

References

malyana